The 1964 Chinese census,  officially the Second National Population Census of the People's Republic of China, was conducted by the People's Republic of China with a zero hour of 1 July 1964. The census results were not publicized until the early 1980s.

The 1964 census included additional information about education, occupation, and class to the information gathered by the first census concerning name, age, sex, nationality, and relationship to heads of households.

Results

Total Population
The census found that the total population of Mainland China in 1964 was 694,581,759.

However, the official summaries published in Chinese Sociology and Anthropology by the Chinese State Statistical Bureau in 1984 listed the 1964 population as 723,070,269. China's official Xinhua news organization continues to report more significant figure.

Demographics
The census found approximately 356,520,000 men and 338,060,000 women living in China, a ratio of 105.46 to 100.

The average household size was 4.43, increasing by 1/10 person per household from the previous census. 40.69% of the population was 14, or under, 55.75% was between 15 and 64, and 3.56% was 65 or older.

Han Chinese accounted for approximately 654,560,000 persons (94.24% of the total). Minorities accounted for approx—forty million twenty thousand persons (5.76%).

127,100,000 Chinese were classified as living in cities, with an urbanization rate of 18.30%.

Provincial Distribution

Controversy
As with the 1953 census, the accuracy of the Second National Population Census was questioned by many outside observers. The information collected about occupation and education could have been more systematic, and it could not even be accurately tabulated even though the nation's illiteracy rate was recorded at 32.26% and 33.58%.

See also
 Demographics of China
 Urbanization in the People's Republic of China
 National Population Census of the People's Republic of China
 First National Population Census of the People's Republic of China (1953)
 Third National Population Census of the People's Republic of China (1982)
 Sixth National Population Census of the People's Republic of China (2010)

Notes

References

1964
1964 in China
China